Elijah Murdock Farm was a historic home located near Yellow Sulphur, Montgomery County, Virginia.  The main dwelling was a two-story, three-bay, hall-parlor-plan dwelling with a two-story log and frame ell.  Also on the property was a contributing washhouse of weatherboarded frame construction, a double-crib log corn crib, a board-and-batten-sided frame outbuilding, and the site of a spring house.

The farmstead was listed on the National Register partly for its architecture and also for the site's archeological potential:  it was deemed "an excellent example of a relatively
undisturbed historic farmstead" with likely valuable deposits relating to occupation and use of the farmstead in the 1800s.

It was listed on the National Register of Historic Places in 1989.

The house has been demolished.

The site was delisted from the National Register in 2001.

References

Former National Register of Historic Places in Virginia
Houses on the National Register of Historic Places in Virginia
Houses in Montgomery County, Virginia
National Register of Historic Places in Montgomery County, Virginia
Archaeological sites in Virginia